The Hung Shing Temple, Tai Kok Tsui or Hung Shing Temple, Fuk Tsun Street is a Hung Shing Temple located at No. 58 Fuk Tsun Street, in the Tai Kok Tsui area of Hong Kong. It is the only Hung Shing temple in urban Kowloon.

History
The temple was originally built in 1881 in the village of Fuk Tsun Heung which was located at the intersection of Boundary Street and Tai Kok Tsui Road. At the time of the 1911 census, the population of Fuk Tsun Heung was 861, the number of males was 610.

In 1928, the Government developed the area and the Village was cleared. In 1930, the temple was rebuilt at the present site, which was named after the Village, and it has since been managed by the Tung Wah Group of Hospitals, by delegation from the Chinese Temples Committee.

Conservation
The temple is listed as a Grade III historic building.

References

External links

 Antiquities Advisory Board. Pictures of Hung Shing Temple, Fuk Tsun Street

Taoist temples in Hong Kong
Tai Kok Tsui
Tung Wah Group of Hospitals
Grade III historic buildings in Hong Kong